Melvin Hunt (born December 15, 1969) is an American professional basketball coach who last served as an assistant coach of the Atlanta Hawks of the National Basketball Association (NBA).

Early life
A native of Tallulah, Louisiana, Hunt earned his bachelor's degree in business administration and a master's degree in education from Baylor University where he spent four years on the basketball team. He was a four-year letterman and a three-year starter for the Bears from 1987–91 and helped lead his team to both the NCAA and NIT tournaments. Following his graduation, Hunt played professional basketball in the Caribbean and Mexico.

Coaching career
Hunt began his coaching career as an assistant coach at Temple High School (TX) before moving to the college ranks where he was the lead assistant coach at University of the Incarnate Word in San Antonio.

On 1999 he signed with the Houston Rockets, where he spent five years, serving his first two years as a video coordinator/scout and his second two as an assistant coach, before spending his final year as the team's college and international scout. After this, he spent a year as an assistant for the Los Angeles Lakers and then five years as an assistant in the Cleveland Cavaliers; there he helped to lead the Cavaliers to one of the most successful stretches in franchise history. In 2008–09, the Cavs won a franchise and NBA-best 66 games, while Hunt and the coaching staff earned the honor of coaching the Eastern Conference in the 2009 NBA All-Star Game in Phoenix. Cleveland also enjoyed great postseason success during Hunt's tenure with the team, reaching the 2007 NBA Finals, the 2009 Eastern Conference Finals and four consecutive appearances in the Eastern Conference Semifinals from 2007–10. On 2010, after finishing his contract with Cleveland, he signed with the Denver Nuggets, spending the next few years as an assistant coach.

He was appointed the interim head coach of the Nuggets after Brian Shaw was fired on March 3, 2015.
On March 3, he made his coaching debut against the Milwaukee Bucks, winning 106–95.

On June 30, 2015 he joined the Dallas Mavericks to become an assistant coach.

Head coaching record

|-
| style="text-align:left;"|Denver
| style="text-align:left;"|
| 23||10||13||||align="center" |4th in Northwest||—||—||—||—
| style="text-align:center;"|Missed playoffs
|- class="sortbottom"
| style="text-align:center;" colspan="2"|Career
| 23||10||13|||| ||—||—||—||—||

Personal life
Hunt and his wife have two children.

References

External links
 Melvin Hunt profile at NBA.com

1969 births
Living people
African-American basketball coaches
American expatriate basketball people in Mexico
American men's basketball players
Atlanta Hawks assistant coaches
Basketball coaches from Louisiana
Basketball players from Louisiana
Baylor Bears men's basketball players
Cleveland Cavaliers assistant coaches
Dallas Mavericks assistant coaches
Denver Nuggets assistant coaches
Denver Nuggets head coaches
High school basketball coaches in the United States
Houston Rockets assistant coaches
Incarnate Word Cardinals men's basketball coaches
Los Angeles Lakers assistant coaches
People from Tallulah, Louisiana
21st-century African-American people
20th-century African-American sportspeople